Kijang is a state constituency in Kelantan, Malaysia, that has been represented in the Kelantan State Legislative Assembly.

History
020/05/01 Pulai Pisang
 020/05/02 Pulai Kundor
 020/05/03 Semut Api
 020/05/04 Kedai Buloh
 020/05/05 Kijang
 020/05/06 Banggol
 020/05/07 Tikat
 020/05/08 Kampung Penambang
 020/05/09 Kampung China

Representation history

References

Kelantan state constituencies